Taurene Parish is an administrative unit of Cēsis Municipality in the Vidzeme region of Latvia. It is one of the 21 parishes in this municipality. Before the administrative reform of 2009, Taurene Parish was part of the former Cēsis District. Taurene is located in a hilly region. Land use consists mostly of agriculture, forests and lakes. The regional road P30 runs through Taureme.

Towns, villages and settlements
Hamlets in Taurene Parish are:

Andreni
Banuzi
Brezgis
Jeruzi
Lodes Muiza
Mezrijas
Nekins
Runtes
Taurene
Zalkalns

Lakes and rivers
The Gauja river flows through Taurene. A number of lakes are located in Taurene parish:

Banuzu 
Brenkuzu 
Dabaru 
Daboru 
Ilzes Lodes 
Kalenites 
Rijas 
Stupenu 
Taurenes 
Zelleskaina

Tourism
The Nekina Manor is located in Nekins.

In Taurene the Dutch environmental organization ARK is involved in a natural grazing project. In 2008 ARK introduced a herd of Konik horses to a privately owned piece of land. In 2012 seven of the horses of this herd were moved to a new grazing project in Ranka.

References 

Parishes of Latvia
Cēsis Municipality
Vidzeme